The Aero Ae 04 was a Czechoslovakian biplane fighter aircraft of 1921. A development of the Ae 02, it was no more successful than its predecessor in attracting purchase orders, and it flew only in prototype form. Undaunted by the lack of interest, development continued as the A.18.

Specifications (Ae 04)

See also

References

Notes

Bibliography
 Green, William and Gordon Swanborough.The Complete Book of Fighters. New York, Smithmark, 1994. .

Ae04
Biplanes
Single-engined tractor aircraft
1920s Czechoslovakian fighter aircraft
Aircraft first flown in 1921